Nasreddine Shili is a Tunisian actor, director, writer and producer.

Director

Cinema

Feature films 
 2012 : Amère patience (Suçon)
 2018 : Subutex

Short films 
 2008 : Boutelisse
 2010 : Chak-Wak

Television 
 2015 : Le Risque
 2022 : Hab El Mlouk

Filmography

Cinema 
 2004 : Le Prince by Mohamed Zran
 2011 : D'Amour et d'eau fraîche (Short films) by Ines Ben Othman

Television 
 2003 : Ikhwa wa Zaman by Hamadi Arafa
 2005 : Café Jalloul by Lotfi Ben Sassi and Imed Ben Hamida
 2006 : Hayet Wa Amani by Mohamed Ghodhbane
 2008-2014 : Maktoub by Sami Fehri and Mehrez Ben Nfisa
 2012 : Onkoud El Ghadhab by Naïm Ben Rhouma
 2014 : Naouret El Hawa (season 1) by Madih Belaïd
 2015 : Le Risque by Nasreddine Shili
 2019  : Wlad Hlal by Nasreddine Shili

Theater 
 2002 : Le Fil, texte by Gao Xingjian and director by Mohamed Driss

Producer 
 2013 : Un Retour by Abdallah Yahya (documentary)
 2013 : Heureux le martyr by Habib Mestiri ( documentary on Chokri Belaïd)
 2015 : Tounes by Ahmed Amine Ben Saad (theater play)

References

External links

Tunisian male film actors
People from Tunis
Living people
21st-century Tunisian male actors
Year of birth missing (living people)